Khoreybeh (also known as Khoreybeh-ye Mahyūb) is a village in Jazireh-ye Minu Rural District, Minu District, Khorramshahr County, Khuzestan Province, Iran. At the 2006 census, its population was 112, in 27 families.

References 

Populated places in Khorramshahr County